River HomeLink is an alternative K-12 school located in Battle Ground, Washington, and is known for allowing a student's parents to participate in class activities, as well as providing a mix between traditional school practices and home school.  It has over 950 students from around the Clark County area.
The school was identified as a site of public exposure during a 2019 measles outbreak, with the public being exposed to the vaccine-preventable illness Jan. 8–9, 2019, which forced the schools to close and the children to go to home.

References

External links
 

High schools in Washington (state)